Rävskär is an island in the Finnish archipelago. It is roughly 6 hectares and about 1 km in perimeter. It is surrounded with some islets that is also part of the island.

Ravskar is situated in the middle of Koö, Gloskär, Grevskär and Svartholmen. It belongs to the municipality of Raseborg.

References

Islands of Finland
Landforms of Southwest Finland